Hogg Hill Mill is a post mill at Icklesham in East Sussex, England.

History

Hogg Hill Mill was built in Pett in 1781 and moved to Icklesham in 1790. It was working by wind until 1920, when it was stopped, owing to a weak weatherbeam. The mill was also used as a filming location for the 1951 British crime drama film The Quiet Woman, directed by John Gilling.

Today, the mill houses the recording studios of Sir Paul McCartney.

Description
Hogg Hill Mill is a post mill on a two-storey roundhouse. It has four spring sails carried on a cast iron windshaft and is winded by a roof-mounted fantail. It is one of only two surviving post mills in England with this feature, and the only one where this can still be seen. The mill drove two pairs of millstones, arranged head and tail. The brake wheel has been removed, but the wooden tail wheel is of clasp arm construction.

Millers

John Skinner 1781–1790 (Pett)
William Sargeant 1791
John Sargeant 1834–1855
Lewis Sargent 1855–1874 (Source: census returns)
Garndner Bros 1890–1920

References

External links
Windmill World Page on Windmill Hill Mill.

Further reading
 Online version 

Post mills in the United Kingdom
Grinding mills in the United Kingdom
Windmills completed in 1781
Paul McCartney
Windmills in East Sussex
Icklesham